Dufferin–Simcoe was an electoral riding in Ontario, Canada. It was created in 1934 during a major redistribution of Ontario ridings. It was abolished in 1986 before the 1987 election and merged into Simcoe West.

Members of Provincial Parliament

References

Former provincial electoral districts of Ontario